Wolf's Clothing is a comedy play by the British writer Kenneth Horne.

It premiered at the New Theatre in Bromley in 1958, and the following year enjoyed a run of 61 performances at the Strand Theatre in London's West End. The cast included Derek Farr, Muriel Pavlow, Ronald Adam, Patrick Cargill, Angela Browne, Elspet Gray and Viola Lyel.

Original cast
Andrew Spicer - Tony Beckley
Janet Spicer -	Diana Scougall
Julian Calvert	- Robert Hartley
Lady Blore - Monica Moore
Sally Calvert - Joan Seton
Sir John Blore - Robert Lankasheer
Yuli - Norma Parnell

West End cast
Andrew Spicer - Patrick Cargill
Janet Spicer -	Elspet Gray
Julian Calvert	- Derek Farr
Lady Blore - Viola Lyel
Sally Calvert - Muriel Pavlow
Sir John Blore - Ronald Adam
Yuli - Angela Browne

References

Bibliography
 Wearing, J.P. The London Stage 1950-1959: A Calendar of Productions, Performers, and Personnel.  Rowman & Littlefield, 2014.

1958 plays
Plays by Kenneth Horne
West End plays
Comedy plays